The Idaho Steelheads are an American professional minor league ice hockey team based in Boise, Idaho, and a member of the ECHL. The Steelheads play in the Mountain Division of the ECHL's Western Conference since the 2016–17 season. In 1996, the Steelheads were announced as a 1997–98 expansion team by Diamond Sports Management, headed by Cord Pereira, as a member of the West Coast Hockey League (WCHL). The Steelheads and the rest of the WCHL joined the ECHL in 2003. As of 2021, the Steelheads are the westernmost ECHL team. During the 2003–04 season and since the 2005–06 season the Steelheads have been an affiliate of the National Hockey League's Dallas Stars. The Austin-based Texas Stars have been the Dallas Stars AHL affiliate since the 2009–10 season. Home games are played at the 5,002-seat Idaho Central Arena in downtown Boise.

The Steelheads are named for a species of seagoing rainbow trout native to Idaho streams and rivers and popular with local anglers. Despite this, the original primary and alternate logos consisted of a puck bouncing off a hockey mask and the state of Idaho respectively. When the team underwent a rebrand in the 2006–07 season, a trout was included in Idaho's alternate. After the departure of the Victoria Salmon Kings in 2011, the Steelheads made the trout logo their new primary one.

History

WCHL

1997–2003
The Steelheads began play as part of a four-team expansion in the West Coast Hockey League in 1997, along with the Tacoma Sabercats, Phoenix Mustangs and Tucson Gila Monsters, which have all since ceased operations. Former New York Islanders defenseman Dave Langevin became Idaho's first head coach. During its inaugural season, in addition to its WCHL schedule the Steelheads played two exhibition games in Boise against the Russian Super League team CKA-Amur (now Amur Khabarovsk). The Steelheads finished third in the WCHL North Division in 1997–98, but were eliminated in the first round of the playoffs by the Anchorage Aces (later known as the Alaska Aces).

Langevin left the team in 1998 and was replaced as head coach by former NHL goaltender Clint Malarchuk. Under Malarchuk the Steelheads were eliminated in the first round of the playoffs in 1998–99 and 1999–00.

In 2000, Malarchuk was succeeded as head coach by John Olver, who had coached the Tacoma Sabercats to the WCHL championship in 1998–99. The Steelheads reached the WCHL finals in 2000–01 and 2001–02, but were defeated by the San Diego Gulls and Fresno Falcons, respectively.

Although the Steelheads finished with the best record in the WCHL's final season in 2002–03, the Falcons eliminated them in the first round of the playoffs.

ECHL
The Idaho Steelheads have been a member of the ECHL since 2003, winning the league's Kelly Cup championship in 2004 and 2007. They are one of only four active ECHL teams to win multiple league championships, alongside the South Carolina Stingrays with three championships, and the Allen Americans and Toledo Walleye (which was then known as the Storm prior to suspending operations in 2007 to build their new arena) with two each. The defunct Alaska Aces and Hampton Roads Admirals also won three ECHL championships each.

2003–2010
In 2003, the WCHL was absorbed by the ECHL and folded. The Steelheads, along with several other WCHL-affiliated teams – namely the Alaska Aces, Bakersfield Condors, Fresno Falcons, Las Vegas Wranglers, Long Beach Ice Dogs and San Diego Gulls – became ECHL members beginning with the 2003–04 season. Idaho won the 2004 Kelly Cup in its first season in the ECHL, defeating the Florida Everblades in the Kelly Cup finals. The Steelheads were the first team to win the ECHL championship in its first year in the league since the Greensboro Monarchs won the title in the league's second season of operation (1989–90).

In 2004–05 the Steelheads were eliminated in the first round of the ECHL playoffs by the Long Beach Ice Dogs. Olver was succeeded as head coach by Derek Laxdal after the season. In 2005–06 Laxdal guided the team back to the playoffs, but they were eliminated in the second round by the Las Vegas Wranglers.

The Steelheads hosted the 2007 ECHL All-Star Game in Boise. Later that year the Steelheads won their second Kelly Cup by defeating the Stockton Thunder, Las Vegas Wranglers and Alaska Aces in the playoffs, and ultimately the Dayton Bombers in the league finals.

In the 2007–08 playoffs, Idaho was swept in the first round by eventual champions the Alaska Aces, and in the 2008–09 playoffs lost to Victoria Salmon Kings in the first round.

In 2009–10, the Steelheads clinched their first Brabham Cup (ECHL regular season title) with one week remaining in the season. They received a bye in the first round of the 2010 Kelly Cup Playoffs before sweeping the Utah Grizzlies in the conference semifinals and beating the Stockton Thunder in six games to win the National Conference championship to advance to their third Kelly Cup finals since joining the league in 2003. They met the Cincinnati Cyclones in the finals, but lost the series 4–1, with each game being decided by one goal.

2010–present
Laxdal left the team after the 2009–10 season to accept the head coaching position with the major junior Edmonton Oil Kings. Although his replacement, Hardy Sauter, led the Steelheads to a playoff series victory against Las Vegas in 2010–11, he was let go after the 2011–12 season after the Steelheads failed to crack the 75-point plateau for the first time since the team's WCHL tenure. In June 2012, the Steelheads named SPHL Augusta RiverHawks head coach Brad Ralph as Sauter's replacement.

In Ralph's first season in Idaho the Steelheads advanced to the Western Conference finals, but were defeated by the Stockton Thunder in five games. In the first round of the 2013–14 playoffs, the Steelheads defeated the Colorado Eagles in six games, culminating in a quadruple overtime victory which set a record as the longest game in ECHL history. They were eliminated in the second round by the eventual champion Alaska Aces.

In 2014–15 the Steelheads won the regular season Pacific Division title with their first 100-point season since 2009–10, but were upset in the first round of the playoffs by the Utah Grizzlies. Ralph left the Steelheads in August 2015 to take the head coaching position with the WHL Kelowna Rockets. Assistant coach and former player Neil Graham was promoted to the head coaching position several days later.

Idaho finished the 2015–16 season in second place in the West Division, although tied in points with the first place Colorado Eagles due to them having more wins. They were seeded fifth in the Western Conference for the 2016 Kelly Cup playoffs and were defeated in the conference quarterfinals by the defending champion Allen Americans, 4-games-to-3. Jefferson Dahl and Emil Molin would tie for the team lead in goals during the regular season with 22 goals. Rob Linsmayer led the team with 57 points. Philippe Desrosiers appeared in a team high 31 games in goal for the Steelheads with a 15–7–6 record with a 2.34 GAA and 2 shutouts. Idaho would finish 15th overall in attendance with an average of 4198 fans per game.

As of the end of the 2018–19 season, the Steelheads have never missed the playoffs in either the WCHL or the ECHL. When the Detroit Red Wings became eliminated from the 2017 Stanley Cup playoffs, the Steelheads then had the longest active playoff streak in professional hockey at twenty seasons in 2016–17. This streak ended when the Steelheads failed to make the playoffs at the end of the 2021-22 season.

In early 2019, it was confirmed that the Steelheads had been approached by the upcoming Seattle Kraken with an interest in the Steelheads becoming their American Hockey League affiliate, although the Kraken later filed for an AHL expansion team in Palm Springs, California, which came to be the Coachella Valley Firebirds.

In July 2019, head coach Neil Graham was hired as an assistant coach of the AHL affiliate Texas Stars and was replaced by Steelheads' assistant Everett Sheen. Due to the COVID-19 pandemic, the Steelheads voluntarily suspended operations for the 2020–21 ECHL season.

Rivalries
The Steelheads' most notable rival are the Utah Grizzlies due to proximity.

The team's former rivals include the refugees of the old WCHL: the Alaska Aces, Fresno Falcons, and Bakersfield Condors. In their original markets, their common history stretched back nearly twenty years. Fresno then folded in 2008, Bakersfield relocated to become the new Norfolk Admirals in 2015, and the Alaska franchise folded in 2017 before it was sold to become the Maine Mariners.

Until their 2014 suspension of operations, the Steelheads also had a rivalry with the Las Vegas Wranglers due to their frequent playoff meetings.

Logos

Media
All Steelheads games are broadcast on AM 1350 KTIK in Boise and have been since the 1997 inception of the franchise.  KTIK and the Steelheads were under the same ownership until Citadel Broadcasting's 2002 purchase of the station. SparkLight cable carries live video on channel 72. Collin Schuck is the voice of the Steelheads for all home and away games since joining the organization in 2018.

In 2021 streaming video coverage was added with the ECHL partnership with FloSports. Collin Schuck's radio play by play is blended with in house CCTV video during away games, and additional production features (such as stream only instant replay on separate feed from CCTV) for home games.

Season-by-season record 
Note: GP = Games played, W = Wins, L = Losses, OTL = Overtime losses, SOL = Shootout losses, Pts = Points, GF = Goals for, GA = Goals against, PIM = Penalties in minutes

Records as of end of the 2021–22 ECHL season.

Players

Current roster
Updated November 12, 2022.

Retired numbers

Championships

References

External links

Idaho Steelheads official site

Dallas Stars minor league affiliates
Steelheads
Ice hockey teams in Idaho
ECHL teams
Ice hockey clubs established in 1996
West Coast Hockey League teams
1996 establishments in Idaho
Arizona Coyotes minor league affiliates